Francisco Moniz (12 June 1966 – 18 June 2020) was an Angolan Olympic boxer. He represented his country in the welterweight division at the 1992 Summer Olympics. He lost his first bout against Stefen Scriggins.

References

External links
 

1966 births
2020 deaths
Angolan male boxers
Olympic boxers of Angola
Boxers at the 1992 Summer Olympics
Welterweight boxers